Les Côtelettes is a 2003 French drama film directed by Bertrand Blier. It was entered into the 2003 Cannes Film Festival.

Cast
 Philippe Noiret as Léonce Grison
 Michel Bouquet as Potier
 Farida Rahouadj as Nacifa
 Catherine Hiegel as Death
 Hammou Graïa as Nacifa's Husband
 Axelle Abbadie as Bénédicte
 Anne Suarez as Agathe
 Jérôme Hardelay as Xavier
 Franck de la Personne as Doctor
 Jean-Jérôme Esposito as Infirmier 2
 Luc Palun as Infirmier 1

References

External links
 

2003 films
2003 drama films
French drama films
2000s French-language films
Films directed by Bertrand Blier
Films produced by Luc Besson
French films based on plays
Films about cancer in France
2000s French films